Stephan, Prince of Lippe (Stephan Leopold Justus Richard Prinz zur Lippe) was born on 24 May 1959 in Detmold, Germany. He is the son of Armin, Prince of Lippe and Traute Becker, and the current head of the House of Lippe since 2015. His traditional titles include Prince of Lippe, Lord and Count of Biesterfeld, Count of Schwalenberg and Sternberg, Hereditary Burgrave of Utrecht, etc.

The prince is the owner of Detmold Castle which is open to the public. He also owns vast forests in the Teutoburger Wald region and in the state of Brandenburg. He is a lawyer and became widely known for his opposition to a nature reserve in the district of Lippe which would have included large parts of his forests. He finally succeeded in getting the project dropped in 2012.

Marriage and children
He married Countess Maria of Solms-Laubach, daughter of Otto, 10th Count of Solms-Laubach and Princess Madeleine of Sayn-Wittgenstein-Berleburg, on 15 October 1994 in Detmold. The wedding was attended by European royalty, among them the bridegroom's uncle Prince Bernhard of Lippe-Biesterfeld and his wife, former Queen Juliana of the Netherlands, the bride's maternal uncle Richard, 6th Prince of Sayn-Wittgenstein-Berleburg and his wife Princess Benedikte of Denmark, the bride's second cousin, Georg Friedrich, Prince of Prussia, and many other members of formerly ruling families of Germany.

The couple live at Detmold Castle and have five children:

 Hereditary Prince Bernhard Leopold Baptist Ernst George Ludwig of Lippe (b. 9 September 1995)
 Prince Heinrich Otto Gustav-Adolf Michael Wico of Lippe (b. 8 April 1997)
 Prince Benjamin Hans Karl Maximilian Paul of Lippe (b. 12 October 1999)
 Princess Luise Anna Astrid Christiane Viktoria of Lippe (b. 9 April 2001)
 Princess Mathilde Pauline Anna Elisabeth of Lippe (b. 7 September 2003)

Ancestry

References

1959 births
House of Lippe
Living people
People from Detmold
Princes of Lippe